La pasión desnuda (Naked Passion) is a 1953 Argentine film. It was written and directed by Luis César Amadori and starred María Félix, Carlos Thompson and Eduardo Cuitiño.

The Argentine Academy of Cinematography Arts and Sciences gave Cuitiño the award for outstanding male performance in this film.

Cast
María Félix as Malva Rey
Carlos Thompson as Pablo Valdes
Eduardo Cuitiño 	 		
Héctor Calcaño 		
Diana Ingro 	 		
Milagros de la Vega 			
Diana Miriam Jones 	 		
Margarita Burke 		
José Comellas 			
Gloria Ferrandiz  		
Daniel Tedeschi

References

External links
 

1953 films
1950s Spanish-language films
Argentine black-and-white films
Films directed by Luis César Amadori
Argentine drama films
1953 drama films
1950s Argentine films